Canada was represented at the FIBA 3x3 World Tour Finals three times, debuting in the inaugural tournament in 2012. So far the teams that represented the country were Edmonton and Saskatoon.

Finals rosters

Finals record

References

Countries at the FIBA 3x3 World Tour
Basketball teams in Canada